MetJet was a charter operator (chartered from Sun Country) based in De Pere, Wisconsin. Its flights originated from Austin Straubel Airport in Green Bay. It served destinations such as Fort Myers and Orlando. On October 15, 2013, the company announced that it was ceasing operations effective October 26, 2013 due to a lack of demand.

Destinations and Departures

See also 
 List of defunct airlines of the United States

References

External links

Defunct airlines of the United States
Companies based in Wisconsin